Ibrahim Köse (born 4 March 1992) is a Finnish former professional footballer of Turkish descent.

Personal life
Köse's younger brother Onuray is also a footballer.

References

External links
  Profile at fclahti.fi

1992 births
Living people
Finnish footballers
FC Lahti players
Veikkausliiga players
Finnish people of Turkish descent
Association football midfielders
Sportspeople from Lahti
FC Hämeenlinna players
FC Ilves players
FC Kuusysi players
Ykkönen players
Kakkonen players